SeaBlade is a shooter game for Xbox, developed by Vision Scape Interactive and published by Simon & Schuster in 2002, and by TDK Mediactive in 2003.

Reception

The game received "generally unfavorable reviews" according to the review aggregation website Metacritic.

References

External links
 

2002 video games
Science fiction shooter video games
Shooter video games
Simon & Schuster Interactive games
Video games developed in the United States
Xbox games
Xbox-only games
TDK Mediactive games
Single-player video games